Jicarilla is an Eastern Southern Athabaskan language spoken by the Jicarilla Apache.

History
The traditional homelands of the Jicarilla Apache (Tinde) were located in the northeast and eastern regions of New Mexico. The Jicarilla Apache expanded over the Texas and Oklahoma panhandles and into the southeast section of Colorado and southwest corner of Kansas. The area supported the Jicarilla Apache with Plains Indian lifestyle. The tribe was divided among in this homeland by two clans: White Clan and Red Clan. The Jicarilla Apache went through multiple battles that led them to leave this homeland and were forced to relocate on a reservation in present day Dulce, NM.

Language revitalization 
680 people reported their language as Jicarilla on the 2000 census. However, Golla (2007) reported that there were about 300 first-language speakers and an equal or greater number of semi-speakers (out of a total ethnic population of 3,100); the census figures therefore presumably include both fluent and semi-speakers.  In 2003, the Jicarilla Apache Nation became the first Tribe in New Mexico to certify community members to teach a Native American language. By 2012, revitalization efforts  had included the compilation of a dictionary, classes, and seasonal camps for young people.

Phonology

Consonants

Jicarilla has 34 consonants:

Navajo and Chiricahua).

Aspirated Stops
The consonant //, occurring in most other Athabaskan languages, only occurs alone in a few forms in Jicarilla and has mostly merged with //. This consequently has made most of the aspirated stops in Jicarilla velar.

Fricatives and Approximants
[w] and [] are allophones of //.
[] is an allophone of //.

Nasals
/m/ is never found word-finally and its most frequent position is in prefixes.
/n/: See section on Syllabic /n/.

Syllabic /n/ in Jicarilla

The consonant /n/ can appear as a syllable and bear a high or low tone, but not a falling tone. High-toned /ń/ actually represents an underlying syllable, /nÍ/. There are four possible contours for Vowel-/n/ and /n/-/n/ combinations: Low-high, High-low, High-high, and Low-low. The contours are illustrated in the following table:

{| class= "wikitable" style="text-align: center"
|-
!Contour
!Vowel-/n/ Combination
!Gloss
!/n/-/n/ Combination
!Gloss
|-
!Low-High
|héenkés'|'What time is it?'
|Nńde
|'stand up'
|-
!High-low
|Ánł’íí
|'You (sg.) are doing something, trying'
|ńnshé
|'You sheared it'
|-
!High-high
|’igo’áń
|'hole'
|Ha’ńń
|'whoever'
|-
!Low-low
|‘ágonlaa
|'You (sg.) made something'
|Bił nnzíí
|'You got sleepy'
|}

(Modified from Tuttle & Sandoval 2002, p. 109)

/n/ may occur between /t/, //, or /n/ and any stem-initial consonant, but when /n/ occurs alone before a stem-initial consonant, it forms a syllable of its own. When preceded by another prefix consonant, /n/ may or may not be judged to form a syllable by native speakers of Jicarilla.

Vowels

Jicarilla has 16 vowels:

All vowels may be

 oral or nasal
 short or long

The long high front oral vowel is phonetically higher than its nasal and short counterparts ( vs. ). The short back vowel is higher than its long and nasal counterparts ( vs. ). The short low vowel is higher than its long and nasal counterparts ( vs. ).

Nasal vowels are indicated by underlining in the Jicarilla orthography.

There are oral and nasal versions of each vowel, but not all combinations of vowel quality, nasality, and tone are possible.

Tone

Jicarilla has three different tones: high, low, and falling.

High tone is indicated with an acute accent. Low tone is unmarked. Falling tone is indicated by a sequence of acute-accented vowel and an unmarked vowel.

 high tone: tsé [tsʰé] (rock), dééh [téːx] (tea)
 low tone: ts’e [ts’è] 'sagebrush', jee [tʃèː] 'pitch'
 falling tone: zháal [ʒâːl] (money), ha’dáonáa''' [xàʔtáònâː] (how?)

Syllables in Jicarilla

Syllable Structure
Syllables may be constructed as CV, CVC, or CV:C (C – Consonant; V – Vowel) depending on the morphology of a sequence. Onset may be any consonant, but coda consonants are limited to //, /l/, //, //, /h/, /s/and /n/.

Syllable Duration
A study of the durational effects of Jicarilla Apache  show that morphology and prosody both affect and determine the durational realization of consonants and syllables. It was found that in a recording of a passage read by native speakers stem, suffix, and particle syllables were found to be longer than prefix syllables, but there is not enough a distinction to see difference in duration. Syllables at the end of phrases were lengthened differently from syllables lengthened because of stress; this is in regards to a ratio of onset lengthening to rhyme lengthening. This study was only a beginning to analysis of Apachean language prosody.

Morphophonology

The Athabaskan morphophonological process known as the "d-effect" occurs when 1st pl/dual iid- is prefixed to a verb stem. The following examples are taken from Phone, Olson and Martinez 2007: 39:

 -iid-	+ classifier [ƚ] → [ƚ]		
 ex.  (< /’o-iid-ƚ-kai’/) ‘we two count it’
 
 -iid- + stem initial [ʔ] → [t’]		
 ex.  (< /hi-iid-‘aaƚ/) 'we two chew it’
 
 -iid- + stem initial [m] → [h]		
 ex.  (< /hi-iid-mas/) ‘we two are rolling’
 
 -iid-	+ stem initial [n] → [h]	
 ex.  (< /go-iid-ndé/) 'we two shout’
 
 -iid-	+ stem initial [y] → [d], [dz]		
 ex.  (< /hi-iid-yá/) ‘we two eat it’
 
 -iid-	+ stem initial gh [ɣ] → [g]		
 ex.  (< /hi-iid-ghá/) ‘we two kill them’
 
 -iid-	+ stem initial [z] → [dz]	
 ex. (< /naa-í-iid-zii/) 'we two work’
 
 -iid-	+ stem initial [l] → [tƚ]		
 ex.  (< /ha-iid-lee/) ‘we two pull it out with a rope’
 
 -iid-	+ other consonant → ø (zero)	
 ex. 	(< /hi-iid-ká’/) ‘we two pound (a drum)’

Morphology

The verb template

Sample text

Jicarilla words of Spanish origin
The Jicarilla people have been in contact with Spanish-speaking and English-speaking peoples for a long time and have over time adopted loanwords that have influenced Jicarilla phonology. Most of the sounds used to take in a loanword from Spanish are sounds in Jicarilla. Some sounds not occurring in Jicarilla phonology are changed into Jicarilla as follows:

/r/ → /l/ or /lal/ as in "alalóos" (from Spanish ‘arroz’  ‘rice’); "goléelo" (from ‘correo’ ‘mail’)
 →  as in "déełbidi" (from ‘intérprete’ ‘interpreter’)
	*Or /l/ as in "béela" (from ‘pera’ ‘pear’)

/f/ → /h/ as in "as’dóoha" (from ‘estufa’ ‘stove’)
	*Or  as in "ga’ée" (from ‘café’ ‘coffee’)
	*Or /k/ as in "kéesda" (from ‘fiesta’ ‘party’)

/gu/ →  as in "awóoha" (from ‘aguja’ ‘needle’)
/b/ → /p/ as in "báaso" (from ‘vaso’ ‘drinking glass’)
Words of Spanish origin using /p/ in Jicarilla are the only instances where the /p/ or any other labial obstruent did not descend from a sonorant.

 → /j/ with nasalization of following corresponding vowel
"Báayoo" (from ‘paño’ ‘scarf’)

Syllable final /l/ turns into  in words of Spanish origin in Jicarilla even though /l/ is a possible coda in Jicarilla. See:

"Bíił" (from ‘automóvil’ ‘automobile’)

"Bołdóon" (from ‘bulto’ ‘small haystack’)

"Gołjóon" (from ‘colchón’ ‘mattress’)

(Observations from entries in Pono, et al., p. 9-16)

 See also 
 Southern Apache Museum

References

Bibliography

 Goddard, Pliny E.  (1911).  Jicarilla Apache texts.  Anthropological papers of the American Museum of Natural History (Vol. 8).  New York: The American Museum of Natural History.
 Opler, Morris. (1941). A Jicarilla expedition and scalp dance. (Narrated by Alasco Tisnado).
 Opler, Morris. (1942). Myths and tales of the Jicarilla Apache Indians.
 Opler, Morris. (1947). Mythology and folk belief in the maintenance of Jicarilla Apache tribal endogamy.
 Phone, Wilma; & Torivio, Patricia. (1981). Jicarilla mizaa medaóołkai dáłáéé. Albuquerque: Native American Materials Development Center.
 Phone, Wilhelmina; Olson, Maureen; & Martinez, Matilda. (2007). Dictionary of Jicarilla Apache: Abáachi Mizaa Iłkee' Siijai. Axelrod, Melissa; Gómez de García, Jule; Lachler, Jordan; & Burke, Sean M. (Eds.). UNM Press.  
 Pono, Filomena P.; Vincenti, Arnold; Phone, Wilma. (1976). Spanish Words in the Jicarilla Language. Loveland, Colorado: Center for In-Service Education.
 Tuttle, Siri G.; & Sandoval, Merton. (2002). Jicarilla Apache. Journal of the International Phonetic Association, 32, 105-112.
 Tuttle, Siri G. (2005). Duration, Intonation and Prominence in Apache. Athabaskan Prosody. ed. by Hargus, Sharon; Rice, Keren. pp. 331–344.
 Wilson, Alan, & Vigil Martine, Rita.  (1996).  Apache (Jicarilla)''.  Guilford, CT: Audio-Forum.  . (Includes book and cassette recording).

External links

 Jicarilla Lexicon. Retrieved 2012-07-13
 Audio files of Jicarilla Apache words
 OLAC resources in and about the Jicarilla Apache language
 Jicarilla Apache Texts, at Internet archive. Bilingual in English and Jicarilla
 
 

Apache culture
Indigenous languages of the Southwestern United States
Indigenous languages of the North American Southwest
Southern Athabaskan languages
Endangered Athabaskan languages
Native American language revitalization
Indigenous languages of New Mexico
Language